The Canada men's national ball hockey team is the men's national ball hockey team of Canada, and a member of the International Street and Ball Hockey Federation (ISBHF).

World Championships

All-time World Championship records

External links 
http://cbha.com
 ISBHF Official Site 

Ball hockey
Ball hockey